The Hon. John Campbell (c. 1660 – 9 April 1729), of Mamore, was a Scottish Whig politician who sat in the Parliament of Scotland from 1700 to 1707 and in the British House of Commons between 1708 and 1727.

Early life
Campbell was the second son of Archibald Campbell, 9th Earl of Argyll, and his wife Lady Mary Stewart, daughter of the 4th Earl of Moray. He was educated at  Glasgow in 1676. Being party to his father's unsuccessful rising against James II, he suffered forfeiture and banishment and was always in financial difficulties.  He served as Captain of foot in the Earl of Argyll's regiment from 1689 until after 1690. In 1692 he married Elizabeth Elphinstone, the daughter of John, 8th Lord Elphinstone

Career

Campbell was Commissioner for Argyllshire in the Parliament of Scotland from 1700 to 1707 and surveyor of the King's works in Scotland from 1705 to 1717. He supported the Union of Scotland and England and after the Union in 1707 was considered sound enough to represent Scotland in the British Parliament that year. At the 1708 general election, he was returned unopposed as  Member of Parliament (MP) for Dunbartonshire. He was returned unopposed again in 1710 when he was classed as a Whig. He made little impression in Parliament, being often absent. He was returned unopposed again at the 1713 general election. He was returned again at the 1715 general election and voted for the septennial bill in 1716. He went into opposition with the Duke of Argyll and lost his official post in 1717.

In 1719 the Duke of Argyll returned to office and Campbell changed his support to the government. In 1722 there was a contest at Dumbarton in which he was defeated in the poll. He was returned on petition on  23 January 1725 and held the seat until the 1727 general election. He then resigned his seat in favour of his son John.

In 1725 a mob besieged his Glasgow mansion (Shawfield built in 1711 by Colen Campbell, now where Glassford Street stands) due to his involvement in the new Malt Tax in Scotland which impacted heavily on brewing profits and the cost of beer. The following day, troops were brought from Dumbarton Castle and upon firing on the continuing riot nine were killed and 17 wounded. 19 persons were captured and put on trial in Edinburgh. In addition Provost John Stark and most of his Deacons were arrested and charged with neglect. The Town Council were obliged to pay Campbell £9000 in compensation and when added to the money he received from sale of the Glasgow mansion he purchased the entire Isle of Islay.

Death and legacy
Campbell died on 9 April 1729. He and his wife had issue:

John Campbell, 4th Duke of Argyll
Charles Campbell of Auchnacreive, MP for Argyllshire (MP)
Neil Campbell heir to Shawfield and Islay
William Campbell (MP)
Mary Campbell, married James Primrose, 2nd Earl of Rosebery
Anne Campbell, married Archibald Edmonstone of Duntreath, had issue:
Sir Archibald Edmonstone, 1st Baronet
Isabella Campbell, married Captain William Montgomery of Rosemount
Jean Campbell, married Captain John Campbell of Carrick
Primrose Cambell, married Simon Fraser, 11th Lord Lovat
Elizabeth Campbell

Trivia

Shawfield mansion was bought by the Old Ship Bank in 1776 and demolished in 1826 to create a new bank.

References

1660 births
1729 deaths
Shire Commissioners to the Parliament of Scotland
Members of the Parliament of Scotland 1689–1702
Members of the Parliament of Scotland 1702–1707
Members of the Parliament of Great Britain for Scottish constituencies
British MPs 1707–1708
British MPs 1708–1710
British MPs 1710–1713
British MPs 1713–1715
British MPs 1715–1722
British MPs 1722–1727
Younger sons of earls